George J. Mitchell (born 1933) was a U.S. Senator from Maine from 1980 to 1995. Senator Mitchell may also refer to:

Members of the United States Senate
Hugh Mitchell (politician) (1907–1996), U.S. Senator from 1944 to 1946
John H. Mitchell (1835–1905), U.S. Senator from Oregon from 1901 to 1905; also served in the Oregon State Senate
John I. Mitchell (1838–1907), U.S. Senator from Pennsylvania from 1881 to 1887
John L. Mitchell (1842–1904), U.S. Senator from Wisconsin from 1893 to 1899; also served in the Wisconsin State Senate
Stephen Mix Mitchell (1743–1835), U.S. Senator from Connecticut from 1793 to 1795

United States state senate members
Anderson Mitchell (1800–1876), North Carolina State Senate
Betty Lou Mitchell (born 1937), Maine State Senate
Clarence Mitchell III (1939–2012), Maryland State Senate
Clarence Mitchell IV (born 1962), Maryland State Senate
George Mitchell (Wisconsin politician) (1822–1908), Wisconsin State Senate
Harlan Erwin Mitchell (1924–2011), Georgia State Senate
Harry Mitchell (born 1940), Arizona State Senate
Holly Mitchell (born 1964), California State Senate
Isaac B. Mitchell (1888–1977), New York State Senate
James George Mitchell (1847–1919), Pennsylvania State Senate
Jethro Mitchell (fl. 1820s), Massachusetts State Senate
John Joseph Mitchell (1873–1925), Massachusetts State Senate
Libby Mitchell (born 1940), Maine State Senate
MacNeil Mitchell (1904–1996), New York State Senate
Nathaniel Mitchell (1753–1814), Delaware State Senate
Richard H. Mitchell (1869–1933), New York State Senate
Shawn Mitchell (fl. 1990s–2010s), Colorado State Senate
Theo Mitchell (born 1938), South Carolina State Senate
Thomas B. Mitchell (died 1876), New York State Senate
Wendell Mitchell (1940–2012), Alabama State Senate
Wiley F. Mitchell (born 1932), Virginia State Senate

See also
Senator Michel (disambiguation)
Charles B. Mitchel (1815–1864), U.S. Senator from Arkansas in 1861 and Confederate States Senator from Arkansas from 1862 to 1864
Samuel L. Mitchill (1764–1831), U.S. Senator from New York from 1804 to 1809